The Vision is a quarterly peer-reviewed journal that focuses on all functional areas of management, including economic and business environment. It is a platform for discussion and exchange of ideas across the widest spectrum of scholarly opinions to promote theoretical, empirical and comparative research on problems confronting the business world.

The Journal is published by SAGE Publications, India in association with the Management Development Institute, Gurgaon.

The journal is a member of the Committee on Publication Ethics (COPE).

Abstracting and indexing 
Vision: The Journal of Business Perspective is abstracted and indexed in:
 DeepDyve
 EBSCO
 OCLC
 J-Gate
 Global Institute for Scientific Information

External links 
 
 Homepage

References 

 COPE
 http://www.mdi.ac.in/research-and-consultancy/vision-mdi-journal.html

SAGE Publishing academic journals
Publications established in 2011
Business and management journals
Quarterly journals